The Noble Fisherman or Robin Hood's Preferment is Child ballad 148, a tale of Robin Hood.

Synopsis
Robin Hood decides to go to sea.  Posing as a poor fisherman, he is hired by a woman with a boat, but laughed at for his lack of seamanship.  French pirates try to take the ship, but Robin shoots them all.  He finds a treasure hoard of twelve thousand pounds aboard the French warship and he offers to share half of it with the others on the boat, but they insist that it is his.

See also
List of the Child Ballads

References

External links
"The Noble Fisherman"

Child Ballads
Robin Hood ballads
Medieval pirates
Songs about pirates
Year of song unknown